Ka'b ibn Mama al-Iyadi was a pre-Islamic Arab figure proverbial for his munificence, and in particular for "giving water to a companion and himself dying of thirst as result". According to Ibn `Abd Rabbih, he was one of three people who reached the highest point of generosity in the pre-Islamic era, the other two were Hatim al-Tai and Harim ibn Sinan al-Murri.

Kaʻb died of dehydration in one of his travels when he favored his companion, al-Namari, over himself for the remaining water they had carried. His story with al-Namari displays a high degree of i'thar (altruism), a trait which the pre-Islamic Arabs regarded with great admiration.

Story with al-Namari 

While traveling in the scorching heat of the sun with a company that included a man from al-Namr ibn Qasit, the group ran short of water and decided to split all the water they had carried equally amongst them. Each time the man who served the water turned around the group and reached Kaʻb for his share, Kaʻb's companion, al-Namari, would look upon Kaʻb and stare at him with an appeal for the water, to which Kaʻb responded by telling the server: "Serve your brother al-Namari" which later became a classical Arabic proverb. This was done repeatedly until Kaʻb became completely exhausted and weak that the moment they found a well some time later, he wasn't able to move and eventually died of thirst.

Honorary mentions

References 

Ancient Arabs
Date of birth unknown
Date of death unknown